The 2006–07 OB I bajnokság season was the 70th season of the OB I bajnokság, the top level of ice hockey in Hungary. Seven teams participated in the league, and Alba Volan Szekesfehervar won the championship.

First round

Qualification round

5th-7th place

Playoffs

Semifinals 
 Alba Volán Székesfehérvár - SC Miercurea Ciuc 3:0 (4:1, 4:1, 5:0)
 Újpesti TE - Dunaújvárosi Acél Bikák 2:3 (2:3 OT, 1:3, 5:4 SO, 3:1, 1:3)

3rd place
 Újpesti TE - SC Miercurea Ciuc 1:2 (2:4, 8:2, 2:3 SO)

Final 
 Alba Volán Székesfehérvár - Dunaújvárosi Acél Bikák 4:0 (5:1, 1:0, 2:0, 4:3)

External links
 Season on hockeyarchives.info

OB I bajnoksag seasons
Hun
OB